Baleshwar Ram (1928-2015) was an Indian politician, seven-times MLA and former Union Minister of State from Bihar.

Early life
Baleshwar Ram was born to Batahu Ram into a Dalit family at Samartha vill., Darbhanga district, Bihar and Odisha Province, British India (now Samastipur distt. Bihar).

He was married to Chinta Devi and they have four children. His son, Dr. Ashok Kumar (Ashok Ram) is a doctor, six-times elected MLA and president of BPPC.

Political career
Ram joined INC and fought his first in 1952 from Hasanpur constituency. He again got elected in 1957 from Dalsinghsarai and in 1962 from Dalsinghsarai West constituency. In 1963 he became Minister of Tourism.

In 1967 Bihar elections he fought successfully from Hayaghat constituency and was re-elected from same seat in 1969 and 1972. He became Minister of Information and Broadcasting in Harihar Singh govt.

In 1980, he became member of Parliament of India from Rosera constituency in Bihar. He was given the portfolio of Union Minister of State for Agriculture and Rural Development.

Ram became Parliamentary Secretary in Bihar govt. He also served as Chairman, Board of Trustees of Ravidas Ashram, General Secretary of State Committee of Dalit Varg Sangh, I.P.S.O. of Bihar and Vice President Indo-Soviet Cultural Society (Bihar).

References

External links
Official biographical sketch on the Parliament of India website

1928 births
2015 deaths
Indian National Congress politicians
Lok Sabha members from Bihar
India MPs 1980–1984